The Negilik Site, also known as Woods' Camp, is a historic and prehistoric site on the banks of the Colville River of Arctic Alaska, United States.  The lowest levels of the site include evidence of prehistoric occupation that has by traditional accounts been associated with trading activities, and includes the remains of a sod house.  The area was in 1949 occupied by the Alaska Native Woods family, who built a frame house and dug an ice cellar for use as a seasonal fishing outpost.

The site was listed on the National Register of Historic Places in 1980.

See also
National Register of Historic Places listings in North Slope Borough, Alaska

References

Archaeological sites on the National Register of Historic Places in Alaska
Geography of North Slope Borough, Alaska
National Register of Historic Places in North Slope Borough, Alaska